Georgian National Astrophysical Observatory  (GENAO) was founded in 1932 by Academician Evgeni Kharadze on Mount Kanobili, near the Abastumani resort in the Samtskhe-Javakheti region of southeastern Georgia. The altitude of Mt. Kanobili varies between 1650 and 1700 m above sea level. 
The observatory is located ~250 km from Tbilisi, the capital of Georgia. Its distance from air pollution and artificial sky illumination, together with excellent natural conditions (a hilly landscape covered with coniferous forest) make this location one of the best for observatories at the same altitude range. The weather is stable, without harsh and sudden changes.

The observatory carries out wide-profile research spanning different fields of astronomy and astrophysics and investigations of the upper layers of Earth's atmosphere.

Telescopes 

 33 cm Reflector - mounted in 1932, now in the Museum of GENAO
 40 cm Zeiss Refractor - mounted in 1936
 44 cm Zeiss Schmidt Camera - mounted in 1940
 70 cm Maksutov Meniscus Telescope - 1955
 48 cm Cassegrain Reflector - mounted in 1968
 40 cm Zeiss Double Astrograph - mounted in 1978
 125 cm Ritchey–Chrétien Reflector - mounted in 1977

See also
 List of astronomical observatories
 Lists of telescopes

References 
 Encyclopedia of Astronomy and Astrophysics, Taylor & Francis, United Kingdom, 2000
 G.N. Salukvadze "The Abastumani Astrophysical Observatory on Mount Kanobili, Tbilisi, 1975"

 Andrew Mekellor Victoria B.C. – “The spectrum of comet Whipple-Fedtke-Tevzadze 1942” (The Astrophysical Journal, Volume 99, N2, 1944)
 “Note on two comets” (Бюлл. Абастуманской астрофизической обсерватории No. 7, 1943 г.)
 Профессор Мартынов Д.Я. – «Комета 1942 Тевзадзе - 1» (Астрономический циркуляр No. 11, 1943 г., 12 февраля)
 Профессор Дубяго – «Элементы орбиты кометы 1942 Тевзадзе - 1» (Астрономический циркуляр No. 17, июль 1943 г.)
 Профессор Барбашев – «О комете 1942 Тевзадзе - 2» (Бюлл. Харковской обсерватории No. 4, 1944 г.)
 Профессор Мартынов Д.Я. – «Комета 1942 Тевзадзе - 2» (Астрономический журнал, том 21, 1944 г.)
 Профессор Дубяго – «Орбита кометы 1942 Тевзадзе - 2» (Астрономический циркуляр No. 21-1943 г., 26 августа)
 Акад. Профессор Воронцов-Вельяминов – «Комета 1942 Тевзадзе - 2» (Астрономический журнал, том XX, вып. 2, 1943 г.)

External links 
 

Buildings and structures in Samtskhe–Javakheti
1932 establishments in Georgia (country)
Science and technology in Georgia (country)
Astronomical observatories in Georgia (country)
Astronomical observatories built in the Soviet Union